Petrosavia sakuraii, one of three species in the genus Petrosavia, is a monocotyledonous plant first described by Tomitaro Makino in 1903 (see illustration), distributed in eastern and south-eastern Asia. They are rare leafless achlorophyllous, mycoheterotrophic plants found in dark montane rainforests.

Distribution 
Japan (Mino Province), China (Guangxi, Sichuan, Taiwan), Vietnam, Myanmar, Sumatra.

References

Bibliography 

 

Flora of Asia
Petrosaviales
Plants described in 1903